Elinkine (also called Elinlin or Elinkinde) is a town in Casamance, Senegal, located at the mouth of the Casamance River,  from Oussouye.

History
A treaty between France and the leaders of Kagnout took place in Elinkine on March 25, 1851, resulting in the cession of the island of Carabane to France.

The well of Umar Tall was classified as a historic monument in 2003.

Administration

The village is part of the rural community of Mlomp, Loudia Ouoloff, Oussouye, Ziguinchor.

Geography
The nearest towns are Efrane Elinkine, Sifoka, Carabane, Samatit, Santiaba Ouolof, and Tamani.

Population
According to PEPAM (Water and Sanitation Program for the Millennium), there are 339 people and 47 households in Elinkine.

Economy
This small fishing port is a popular tourist location. This is partially because of its beach, but also because it is the embarkation point for the island of Carabane.

Bibliography

External links

Maps, weather and airports for Elinkine
 Elinkine on the PEPAM website 
 Elinkine on the SEM website

Populated places in Ziguinchor Region